Lavnin (Hurvat Libnah / Tel Lavnin / Kh.

In April 2019, the Jerusalem District Planning and Building Committee announced that the site would be incorporated into a new national park in the Judean Shephelah, called the "Lavnin Ridge Nature Reserve and National Park," an area to span over 1,000 dunams (250 acres) within the Mateh Yehuda Regional Council.

Etymology and identification
The name Lavnin is a reflection of popular etymology, the modern Hebrew name being a crude translation of the Arabic word Beida, meaning "white." Others say that its modern name represents "the hill of bricks," hence: Tell Livnin (livanim), based on a different pronunciation of the Hebrew that is typically written without vowels. Archaeologists are divided as to the site's original name, some holding the view that it may have been the biblical Libnah (Joshua 15:42; 21:13) based on its Arabic name, while others thought it to have been the Chezib of Judah, or the Azekah (Joshua 10:10-11) mentioned by Epiphanius.

Depending on whether the site was the same as Lobana, as described by Eusebius in his Onomasticon as "now being a village in Eleutheropolitana" (in the vicinity of Beit Gubrin), the town would have still been settled and occupied as late as the 4th-century CE. Archaeologist Boaz Zissu rejects the notion that the site could have been Chezib of Judah, saying that "since Khirbet Tell el-Bēḍā / Tel Lavnīn was clearly occupied during the Byzantine Period, it is questionable whether this site is the same as Eusebius’ ruined Chasbi." Others proposed that Libnah may be the ruin known as Tell eṣ-Ṣāfi, a view now largely rejected. Travellers C.W.M. van de Velde and H.B. Tristram both placed the ancient ruin of Libnah at the ruin called ʻIrâq el-Menshiyeh, where Kiryat Gat now stands; this view is also now largely rejected.

Lt. Col. Conder of the Palestine Exploration Fund professed to be uncertain about the site of the biblical Libnah, and was equally unfamiliar with the connection between the Arabic name el-Beida and Libnah (= "white"), although acknowledging that "it (Libnah) indicates the 'white' chalk of the Southern Shephelah, and it was taken by Joshua (Joshua 10:30) after Makkedah and before Lachish and Hebron."

Flora and fauna
The Mediterranean plants endemic to the area are the Palestine oak (Quercus calliprinos), terebinth (Pistacia atlantica), lentisk (Pistacia lentiscus), buckthorn (Rhamnus lycioides), and strawberry tree (Arbutus andrachne). Some of these trees have protected status. The area abounds also in fowl such as the partridge (Alectoris chukar), the honey-sucker, the bulbul (Pycnonotus xanthopygos), the black-headed bunting, and the titmouse. The species of agamid lizard, Laudakia stellio, and hares (Lepus) are also common to this region. More rarely, the mongoose (Herpestes ichneumon) and the honey-badger (Mellivora capensis) may be seen.

Archaeology
Lieut. H. H. Kitchener of the Palestine Exploration Fund visited the site between the years 1874–75 and noted many caves, in one of which there were 120 niches in the wall, apparently used for urns. The site is similar to many of those in the region, having a network of underground hiding complexes, thought to date back to the Bar Kokhba revolt. During an archaeological survey of the site in 1998, Israel Antiquities Authority archaeologist Boaz Zissu described what appeared to be a "lion's den" at Tel Lavnin (having a side-entrance and an observation point from above), a Second Temple period ritual bath (mikveh), burial tombs from the same period, fortifications, and Byzantine era graffiti on the walls. In 2001 Zissu, on behalf of the IAA, conducted a second survey of the site, which abounds with burial caves, and contains a columbarium, along with water cisterns carved into the bedrock. A decorated lintel rests at the top of the hill. A small area containing two pits and a room with an arched vault built of ashlar stones was exposed in the northeastern part.

See also
Libnah

Gallery

References

Further reading

Bibliography

, s.v. Lebna

External links
Survey of Western Palestine, Map 21:  IAA, Wikimedia commons

Mateh Yehuda Regional Council
Ancient villages in Israel
Former populated places in Israel
District of Jerusalem
Archaeological sites in Israel
Canaanite cities
Biblical geography
Bronze Age sites in Israel
Ancient Israel and Judah
Hebrew Bible cities
Tells (archaeology)